Acoustic is a 2010 South Korean omnibus film depicting stories of love, hope, and music among twenty-somethings - all set within the Hongdae area of Seoul.

Synopsis
Episode 1 "Broccoli" Se-kyung, a singer-songwriter who is suffering from a rare disease, can only survive on instant cup ramen noodles. Rejected by record executives for her "mushy" music and told only her looks sell, she runs out of the hospital in order to make known what could be her last song.

Episode 2 "Bakery Attack" Vocalist Seong-won and drummer Hae-won decide to sell their beloved guitar out of hungry desperation. Thanks to Hae-won's forgetfulness and mysterious thinking process, he leaves it at a bakery store, whose owner happens to be an amateur musician. He thus proceeds to preach to the two about what it really means to love music, and they seem to be inspired to pursue their dreams no matter how difficult it is. (Based on the short story "The Second Bakery Attack" by Haruki Murakami, from his first short story collection The Elephant Vanishes.)

Episode 3 "Unlock" Set in the distant future, a world where music has ceased to exist and sound is used as a weapon, Ji-hoo falls for Jin-hee, an uncanny girl with a prosthetic arm. The two embark on a mission to access an iPhone, which has become a treasured relic and stores a precious song from the girl's childhood.

Cast

Broccoli
Shin Se-kyung as Se-kyung
Im Joon-il as Ji-gyu
Lee Dong-hyun as Dong-hyun
Lee Jong-hoon as bar owner
Lee Jin-woo as boy
Lee Ji-ah as girl

Bakery Attack
Lee Jong-hyun as Kim Seong-won
Kang Min-hyuk as Kim Hae-won
Choi Deok-moon as bakery owner
Yoon Ji-yeong as part-time worker
Kim Jeong-kwon as guitar guy
Go Yoo-mi as female customer

Unlock
Baek Jin-hee as Jin-hee
Im Seulong as Ji-hoo
Kim Jeong-seok as Professor Noh
Lee Jeong-heon as black marker weapon dealer
Won Woong-jae as pub owner
Yoon Jong-hyeok as Ji-hoo's junior colleague
Son Sang-hyeon as follower 1
Lee Tae-yeon as follower 2
Oh Hyeong-jin as liberal arts professor    
Kim Seon-ah as Jin-hee's mom
Lee Eun-joo as nurse
Jo Eun-seo as young Jin-hee

References

External links 

 

South Korean anthology films
Films based on works by Haruki Murakami
Films based on short fiction